Sant'Antonio di Padova a Circonvallazione Appia (Saint Anthony of Padua at the Appian Ring-Road) is a church in Rome, built in 1938 in the Rationalist style. It was made a cardinalate deaconry on 18 February 2012 by Pope Benedict XVI. It is currently assigned to Cardinal Karl-Josef Rauber.

Cardinal-Deacons
Julien Ries (18 February 2012 - 23 February 2013)
Karl-Josef Rauber (14 February 2015 - present)

External links

Antonio di Padova Circonvallazione
Antonio di Padova Circonvallazione
Rome Q. IX Appio-Latino